BPRC may refer to:
Biomedical Primate Research Centre
Byrd Polar Research Center
British Powerboat Racing Club